Chad Davis may refer to:

 Chad Davis (footballer) (born 1980), Australian rules footballer
 Chad Davis (American football) (born 1973), American football player